is a Japanese former footballer who last played for Fukushima United.

Career
Teramae retired at the end of the 2019 season.

Career statistics

Club

Notes

References

External links

1995 births
Living people
Association football people from Nara Prefecture
Kanagawa University alumni
Japanese footballers
Association football defenders
J3 League players
Fukushima United FC players